I'm a Celebrity...Get Me Out of Here! returned to ITV1 and ITV2 for a ninth series on 15 November 2009. It broadcast for three weeks and concluded on 4 December 2009. There was however an additional Coming Out episode on 7 December 2009, showing all the celebrities and what they did after they left the jungle.

This was the first and so far only series to feature a contestant from a previous series, Katie Price. She made her second appearance on the show, having first appeared the third series in 2004. Price was paid £400,000, making her the highest-paid I'm a Celebrity contestant, up until she was surpassed by boxer Amir Khan in series 17. It was won by Gino D'Acampo.

Presenters
Ant & Dec returned to present the main show. Emma Willis and Matt Willis stood down from the role as presenters of I'm a Celebrity...Get Me Out of Here! NOW! and were replaced by last year's winner Joe Swash and Caroline Flack for the 2009 series.

Celebrities

The full celebrity line-up was revealed on 11 November 2009.

Camps

The contestants made their way into the jungle in a variety of ways, including sky-diving and hiking. They were situated in the base camp used in previous series.

On Day 5 the camp was split into 2 teams. Each celebrity had to draw a stick and the 2 with a coloured tip were captains and took turns to select their team members. Colin picked Justin, Katie, Sabrina, Jimmy and Joe. Lucy picked Gino, Stuart, George, Sam and Kim.

A trial followed in which they were each positioned under a bucket and using a stick had to balance the contents of the bucket by keeping a button pressed. The winning team was the one that had the final member still standing after all of their opponents had been eliminated. Sabrina was the final contestant to survive, making Colin’s team the winner. They were excluded from the first elimination vote and lived in the relative luxury of base camp.

Base Camp was transformed into a relative jungle paradise. It was furnished with camp chairs, pillows for the beds, dressing gowns, firewood and purified water.
Lucy’s team entered the Exile camp. It was a rat infested clearing containing only the bare essentials, with one log to sit on and only one bed, no shower and only rice and beans to eat.

Over the next 3 days, everyone in Exile Camp participated in a Bush Battle with the winner of each one being allowed to return to Base Camp and gain immunity from the first public elimination vote. The battles were won by Stuart, Kim and George.

While the camp was split, all celebrities selected for Bushtucker Trials competed for 12 stars as usual. However, the first meals were allocated to Base Camp, 1 for each member at the time with any remainder providing food to the Exile team, except for Vile Vending in which Kim competed for 5 stars for Exile while Katie competed for 7 for base camp. This would have placed added pressure on any Exile member who completed a 1-person trial, as they would have had to collect all 12 stars to feed their own camp, however Katie competed in both of them, and, despite trying, failed to get all stars in any of her 6 trials.

On Day 8 the two camps reunited, located at 'Base Camp'.

Results and elimination
 Indicates that the celebrity was immune from the vote
 Indicates that the celebrity received the most votes
 Indicates that the celebrity received the fewest votes and was eliminated immediately (no bottom two/three)
 Indicates that the celebrity was in the bottom two or three in the public vote

On 17 November 2009 (Day 4) Camila Dallerup withdrew because she fell ill. On 22 November 2009 (Day 9), Katie Price withdrew from the competition also because she was fed up of the jungle and doing 6 bushtucker trials in a row. On 30 November 2009 (Day 17), George Hamilton withdrew from the competition because of personal reasons.

Notes
 On Day 10 the bottom two (who were Lucy Benjamin & Sam Fox) were not revealed on air.
 On Day 13, all of the celebrities faced the public vote, with the bottom three being revealed as Sam, Sabrina and Jimmy. The other celebrities were declared safe, and the phone lines for the bottom three reopened for another 24 hours.
 On Day 14 the bottom two (who were Jimmy White & Sam Fox) were not revealed on air.
 On Day 15, all of the celebrities faced the public vote, with the bottom two being revealed as Joe and Stuart. The other celebrities were declared safe and both Joe and Stuart would go to Jungle Jail where they will go head to head with the winner returning to camp and the loser being eliminated from camp. Joe lost the trial to Stuart, therefore he was eliminated.

Bushtucker Trials
The contestants take part in daily trials to earn food

 The public voted for who they wanted to face the trial
 The contestants decided who did which trial
 The trial was compulsory and neither the public nor celebrities decided who took part

Notes
 This trial determined how many beds and dinners would be in camp.
 Kim and George were excluded from this trial on medical grounds.
 George was excluded from this trial on medical grounds.
 This was a live trial.
 In a twist the celebrity from each camp who received the most votes faced the trial together.
 As Katie left the jungle on Day 9, Kim joined Joe in this trial as she received the third highest number of votes.
 Kim, George and Joe were excluded from this trial.
 This trial decided who left the jungle (which was Joe) and not how camp were fed that night. It was not revealed if the camp had to earn their meals.
 Kim was excluded from this trial on medical grounds, so her star was taken by Gino.
Kim and Joe competed in four rounds of both having the same drinks, to win all 8 meals, then completed another with different drinks to win the ninth meal and a chocolate treat. During this final round Kim vomited her "sampuka" on Ant and Dec, and was told it didn't count, but was given another, which she drank. Katie Price was originally voted into this trial (the results were given the day before) but she decided to quit the jungle (withdraw), so Kim Woodburn took her place because she was the person with the 3rd most votes.

Star count

Bush Battles

 To decide the winner, Lucy and Kim each had to guess (to the nearest hour, minute and second) how long they did the battle for.

Ratings 

All ratings are taken from the UK Programme Ratings website, BARB.

Controversy
Gino D'Acampo and Stuart Manning were initially charged by New South Wales Police after RSPCA Australia complained over their killing and eating of a rat during the show, the killing of animals for performance being illegal.
ITV apologised for not having properly advised the contestants of Australian legislation regarding animal cruelty. However, the charges were dropped against D'Acampo and Manning when ITV accepted responsibility for the incident. They were subsequently charged around £160000.

References

External links 
 
 

2009 British television seasons
09
Animal cruelty incidents in television